Sheraton Norfolk Waterside Hotel, originally built in 1976 as the Downtown Norfolk Omni International Hotel and later known as Omni Norfolk Waterside Hotel, is a 10-story structure in the business district of Norfolk, Virginia, United States. It became a Sheraton Hotel in 1998.

Construction of the hotel began in 1974, and was completed in Jan. 1976 at a cost of $18 million.

History of renovations

The hotel underwent its first major renovations in 2007. Another $12 million renovation was completed in 2018.

See also 
 History of Norfolk, Virginia
 History of Hampton Road, Virginia

References

Buildings and structures completed in 1976
Downtown Norfolk, Virginia
History of Norfolk, Virginia
Hotel buildings completed in 1976